Chileans in the United Kingdom (Spanish: Chilenos en Reino Unido) are people of Chilean origin living in the United Kingdom.

History
When approximately 2,500 Chilean exiles (including businessmen, professors, and students) arrived in Great Britain escaping the right-wing military coup d'etat of September 11, 1973, they were met by a small community of Latin Americans who were already there. In the 1970s right-wingers fled the Allende government, and later persecuted Allende's sympathizers escaped the Pinochet regime. The Chilean community has settled well in the country, and the majority are of European ancestry. The size of the Chilean British population is hard to estimate as many have gone back to Chile, or move fluidly between several places.

Population
At the time of the 2001 UK Census, 5,131 Chilean-born people were living in the UK. The 2011 census recorded 6,456 Chilean-born residents in England, 120 in Wales, 495 in Scotland and 68 in Northern Ireland.

Notable individuals
 Mario Aguilar, academic
 Santiago Cabrera, actor, played Isaac Mendez in the series Heroes and recently Cristóbal "Chris" Ríos in Star Trek: Picard
 Marcela Contreras DBE, Scientist
 Joan Jara, activist
 Olga Lehmann, 20th-century painter
 Manuel Pellegrini, football manager
 George Robledo Oliver, footballer
 Ted Robledo Oliver, footballer
 Alexis Sánchez, footballer for Manchester United and Chile
 Otto Schade, artist and architect

See also
 Chile–United Kingdom relations
 Chileans in the Falkland Islands

References

 
Chilean
Immigration to the United Kingdom by country of origin
Latin American diaspora in the United Kingdom
Unitedkingdom